Yuehu may refer to:

Places
Lake Yue (月湖), in the city of Ningbo, in the Zhejiang province of China (its name translates as "Moon Lake")
Yuehu District (月湖区), in Yingtan, Jiangxi, China
Yuehu Subdistrict, Changsha (月湖街道), a subdistrict of Kaifu District, Changsha, China
Yuehu Park (月湖公园), a park in Kaifu District, Changsha
Yuehu Mosque

Musical instruments
Gaohu, also known as Yuehu (粤胡), a bowed string instrument used in Cantonese music